The LEN Champions League is the top-tier European professional water polo club competition with teams from up to 18 countries. It is organized by the Ligue Européenne de Natation.

The competition started in 1963 as European Cup. A change of name and format occurred in 1996, with the competition being renamed Champions League and the final four system being established as the format of choice, for the first time during the 1996–97 LEN Champions League. From 2003 to 2011 the competition was named LEN Euroleague (with the change of name being simply a re-branding) and from 2011 and on LEN Champions League, its current name.

LEN Champions League is the most popular water polo league in the European continent. It has been won by 24 clubs, 10 of which have won the title more than once. The most successful club in the competition is Pro Recco, with nine titles. The current European champion is Pro Recco, who won their ninth title after defeating FTC Telekom Budapest in the 2020–21 LEN Champions League Final in Belgrade.

History

Names of the competition 
 1963–1996: European Cup
 1996–2003: Champions League
 2003–2011: LEN Euroleague
 2011–present: LEN Champions League

Title holders 

 1963–64  Partizan
 1964–65  Pro Recco
 1965–66  Partizan
 1966–67  Partizan
 1967–68  Mladost
 1968–69  Mladost
 1969–70  Mladost
 1970–71  Partizan
 1971–72  Mladost
 1972–73  OSC Budapest
 1973–74  MGU Moscow
 1974–75  Partizan
 1975–76  Partizan
 1976–77  CSK VMF Moscow
 1977–78  Canottieri Napoli
 1978–79  OSC Budapest
 1979–80  Vasas
 1980–81  Jug Dubrovnik
 1981–82  Barcelona
 1982–83  Spandau 04
 1983–84  Stefanel Recco
 1984–85  Vasas
 1985–86  Spandau 04
 1986–87  Spandau 04
 1987–88  Sisley Pescara
 1988–89  Spandau 04
 1989–90  Mladost
 1990–91  Mladost
 1991–92  Jadran Split
 1992–93  Jadran Split
 1993–94  Újpest
 1994–95  Catalunya
 1995–96  Mladost
 1996–97  Posillipo
 1997–98  Posillipo
 1998–99  POŠK
 1999–00  Bečej
 2000–01  Jug Dubrovnik
 2001–02  Olympiacos
 2002–03  Pro Recco
 2003–04  Honvéd
 2004–05  Posillipo
 2005–06  Jug Dubrovnik
 2006–07  Pro Recco
 2007–08  Pro Recco
 2008–09  Primorac Kotor
 2009–10  Pro Recco
 2010–11  Partizan
 2011–12  Pro Recco
 2012–13  Crvena zvezda
 2013–14  Atlètic-Barceloneta
 2014–15  Pro Recco
 2015–16  Jug Dubrovnik
 2016–17  Szolnok
 2017–18  Olympiacos
 2018–19  Ferencváros
 2019–20 Cancelled due to the COVID-19 pandemic 
 2020–21  Pro Recco
 2021–22  Pro Recco

Finals

Titles by club

Titles by nation 

*Results until the breakup of Yugoslavia in 1991 and the self-determination of its rump state Serbia and Montenegro in 2006. Clubs from present day Serbia won the title 7 times and were runners-up additional 4 times, clubs from present day Croatia won the title 7 and were runners-up one time, clubs from present day Montenegro were runners-up one time.

*The results of West Germany counted with those of Germany.

*Results until the dissolution of the Soviet Union in 1991. Clubs from present day Russia won the title 2 times and were runners-up additional 5 times, clubs from present day Kazakhstan were runners-up once time.

Records 
 Pro Recco has been the most successful club, having won the competition a record ten times.
 Mladost is the only club to have won the competition three times in a row (1968, 1969, 1970).
 Partizan and Pro Recco are the only two clubs to have won the European Championship twice in a row for two times (1966, 1967 & 1975, 1976) and (2007, 2008 & 2021, 2022)
 Spandau 04 (1986, 1987), Mladost (1990, 1991), Jadran Split (1992, 1993) and Posillipo (1997, 1998) are the other five teams to have won the European Championship twice in a row, only for one time.

Players

Most Titles

4 titles: Karlo Stipanić, Zlatko Šimenc, Ronald Lopatny, Miro Poljak, Marijan Žužej

Titles with 3 clubs:  Felipe Perrone

Players/Coaches
Most Titles

* Two players were players and coaches at the same time in the winning teams. Boris Čukvas won three titles in a dual role. He was a player and Partizan's coach during the seasons in which the Belgrade-based club won its first three titles (1963/64, 1965/66 and 1966/67). Eraldo Pizzo was a player and Pro Recco's coach in the season 1964/65.

Titles (2) as a player and a coach: Veselin Đuho, Marco Baldineti, Vjekoslav Kobeščak.

Coaches
Most Titles

Awards

MVP Final Tournament
2010 –  Vanja Udovičić
2011 –  Tamás Kásás
2012 –  Denes Varga
2013 –  Andrija Prlainovic
2014 –   Albert Español
2015 –  Felipe Perrone
2016 –  Felipe Perrone
2017 –  Andrija Prlainovic
2018 –  Josip Pavic
2019 –  Denes Varga
2020 Not awarded due to COVID-19 pandemic
2021 –   Dusan Mandic
2022 –   Giacomo Cannella

Top Scorer by Season
2012–13 –  Felipe Perrone 31 goals 
2013–14 –  Filip Filipović 51 goals
2014–15 –  Sandro Sukno 34 goals 
2015–16 –  Denes Varga 33 goals
2016–17 –  Felipe Perrone 42 goals
2017–18 –  Darko Brguljan 42 goals 
2018–19 –  Kostas Genidounias 42 goals
2019–20 Not awarded due to COVID-19 pandemic
2020–21 –  Angelos Vlachopoulos 41 goals
2021–22 –  Gergő Zalánki 42 goals

References

External links 
 LEN Champions League at LEN

 
Recurring sporting events established in 1964
Champions League
Multi-national professional sports leagues